In topology and related areas of mathematics, the neighbourhood system, complete system of neighbourhoods, or neighbourhood filter  for a point  in a topological space is the collection of all neighbourhoods of

Definitions

Neighbourhood of a point or set

An  of a point (or subset)  in a topological space  is any open subset  of  that contains 

Importantly, a "neighbourhood" does  have to be an open set; those neighbourhoods that also happen to be open sets are known as "open neighbourhoods." 
There are many other types of neighbourhoods that are used in topology and related fields like functional analysis. 
The family of all neighbourhoods having a certain "useful" property often forms a neighbourhood basis, although many times, these neighbourhoods are not necessarily open. Locally compact spaces, for example, are those spaces that, at every point, have a neighbourhood basis consisting entirely of compact sets. 

Neighbourhood filter

The neighbourhood system for a point (or non-empty subset)  is a filter called the  The neighbourhood filter for a point  is the same as the neighbourhood filter of the singleton set

Neighbourhood basis

such that for all  there exists some  such that  
That is, for any neighbourhood  we can find a neighbourhood  in the neighbourhood basis that is contained in 

 

Neighbourhood subbasis

Examples

but none of the following sets are neighborhoods  of : 
 
where  denotes the rational numbers. 

Said differently,  is a neighborhood of a point  if and only if 

Neighbourhood bases

In any topological space, the neighbourhood system for a point is also a neighbourhood basis for the point. The set of all open neighbourhoods at a point forms a neighbourhood basis at that point. 
This means every metric space is first-countable.

Given a space  with the indiscrete topology the neighbourhood system for any point  only contains the whole space, .

Seminormed spaces and topological groups

In a seminormed space, that is a vector space with the topology induced by a seminorm, all neighbourhood systems can be constructed by translation of the neighbourhood system for the origin,

This is because, by assumption, vector addition is separately continuous in the induced topology. Therefore, the topology is determined by its neighbourhood system at the origin. More generally, this remains true whenever the space is a topological group or the topology is defined by a pseudometric.

Properties

See also

References

Bibliography

  
  
  

General topology